Francklin may refer to:

William Francklin (1763–1839), English orientalist and army officer
Michael Francklin (1733–1782), Lieutenant Governor of Nova Scotia from 1766–1772
Thomas Francklin  (1721–1784), English academic, clergyman, writer and dramatist

See also
Franklin (disambiguation)